Skunks are mammals in the family Mephitidae. They are known for their ability to spray a liquid with a strong, unpleasant scent from their anal glands. Different species of skunk vary in appearance from black-and-white to brown, cream or ginger colored, but all have warning coloration. 

While related to polecats and other members of the weasel family, skunks have as their closest relatives the Old World stink badgers.

Taxonomy

In alphabetical order, the living species of skunks are:

 Family Mephitidae
 Genus: Conepatus
 Conepatus chinga – Molina's hog-nosed skunk
 Conepatus humboldtii – Humboldt's hog-nosed skunk
 Conepatus leuconotus – American hog-nosed skunk
 Conepatus semistriatus – striped hog-nosed skunk
 Genus: Mephitis
 Mephitis macroura – hooded skunk
 Mephitis mephitis – striped skunk
 Genus: Spilogale
 Spilogale angustifrons – southern spotted skunk
 Spilogale gracilis – western spotted skunk
 Spilogale putorius – eastern spotted skunk
 Spilogale pygmaea – pygmy spotted skunk

Terminology 
The word skunk is dated from the 1630s, adapted from a southern New England Algonquian language (probably Abenaki) , from Proto-Algonquian , from  'to urinate' +  'fox'. Skunk has historic use as an insult, attested from 1841. 

In 1634, a skunk was described in The Jesuit Relations:

In Southern United States dialect, the term polecat is sometimes used as a colloquial nickname for a skunk, even though polecats are only distantly related to skunks.

As a verb, skunk is used to describe the act of overwhelmingly defeating an opponent in a game or competition. Skunk is also used to refer to certain strong-smelling strains of marijuana whose smell has been compared to that of a skunk's spray.

Description 
They have moderately elongated bodies with relatively short, well-muscled legs and long front claws for digging. They have five toes on each foot.

Although the most common fur color is black and white, some skunks are brown or grey and a few are cream-colored. All skunks are striped, even from birth. They may have a single thick stripe across the back and tail, two thinner stripes, or a series of white spots and broken stripes (in the case of the spotted skunk).

Behavior

Skunks are crepuscular and solitary animals when not breeding, though in the colder parts of their range, they may gather in communal dens for warmth. During the day they shelter in burrows, which they can dig with their powerful front claws. For most of the year the normal home range for skunks is 0.5 to 2.0 miles in diameter, with males expanding during breeding season to travel 4 to 5 miles per night.

Skunks are not true hibernators in the winter, but do den up for extended periods of time. However, they remain generally inactive and feed rarely, going through a dormant stage. Over winter, multiple females (as many as 12) huddle together; males often den alone. Often, the same winter den is repeatedly used.

They are short-lived; their lifespan in the wild can reach seven years, with most living only up to a year. In captivity, they may live for up to 10 years.

Reproduction
Skunks mate in early spring and are polygynous (that is, successful males are uninhibited from mating with additional females.)

Before giving birth (usually in May), the female excavates a den to house her litter of four to seven kits.

Skunks are placental, with a gestation period of about 66 days.

When born, skunk kits are blind and deaf, but already covered by a soft layer of fur. About three weeks after birth, they first open their eyes; the kits are weaned about two months after birth. They generally stay with their mother until they are ready to mate, roughly at one year of age.

The mother is protective of her kits, spraying at any sign of danger. The male plays no part in raising the young.

Diet
Skunks are omnivorous, eating both plant and animal material and changing their diets as the seasons change. They eat insects, larvae, earthworms, grubs, rodents, lizards, salamanders, frogs, snakes, birds, moles, and eggs. They also commonly eat berries, roots, leaves, grasses, fungi and nuts.

In settled areas, skunks also seek garbage left by humans. Less often, skunks may be found acting as scavengers, eating bird and rodent carcasses left by cats or other animals. Pet owners, particularly those of cats, may experience a skunk finding its way into a garage or basement where pet food is kept. Skunks commonly dig holes in lawns in search of grubs and worms.

Skunks use their long claws to break apart rotting logs to find bugs that live within them. They also use those claws to help dig for insects, which leaves behind pits, which are easy signs of foraging. The claws also help with pinning down live and active prey. 

Skunks are one of the primary predators of the honeybee, relying on their thick fur to protect them from stings. The skunk scratches at the front of the beehive and eats the guard bees that come out to investigate. Mother skunks are known to teach this behavior to their young.

Spray

Skunks are notorious for their anal scent glands, which they can use as a defensive weapon. They are similar to, though much more developed than, the glands found in species of the family Mustelidae. Skunks have two glands, one on each side of the anus. These glands produce the skunk's spray, which is a mixture of sulfur-containing chemicals such as thiols (traditionally called mercaptans), which have an offensive odor. The thiols also make their spray highly flammable. A skunk's spray is powerful enough to ward off bears and other potential attackers. The spray can also cause irritation and even temporary blindness, and is sufficiently powerful to be detected by a human nose up to 5.6 km (3.5 miles) downwind. Their chemical defense is effective, as illustrated by this extract from Charles Darwin's 1839 book The Voyage of the Beagle:

Skunks carry just enough for five or six successive sprays – about 15 cm3 – and require up to ten days to produce another supply. Their bold black and white coloration makes their appearance memorable. It is to a skunk's advantage to warn possible predators off without expending scent: black and white aposematic warning coloration aside, threatened skunks will go through an elaborate routine of hisses, foot-stamping, and tail-high deimatic or threat postures before resorting to spraying. Skunks usually do not spray other skunks, except among males in the mating season. If they fight over den space in autumn, they do so with teeth and claws.

Most predators of the Americas, such as wolves, foxes, and badgers, seldom attack skunks, presumably out of fear of being sprayed. The exceptions are reckless predators whose attacks fail once they are sprayed, dogs, and the great horned owl, which is the skunk's only regular predator. In one case, the remains of 57 striped skunks were found in a single great horned owl nest.

Skunks are common in suburban areas. Frequent encounters with dogs and other domestic animals, and the release of the odor when a skunk is run over, have led to many misconceptions about the removal of skunk odor, including the pervasive idea that tomato juice will neutralize the odor. These household remedies are ineffective, and only appear to work due to olfactory fatigue. The Humane Society of the United States recommends treating dogs using a mixture of dilute hydrogen peroxide (3%), baking soda, and dishwashing liquid.

Skunk spray is composed mainly of three low-molecular-weight thiol compounds, (E)-2-butene-1-thiol, 3-methyl-1-butanethiol, and 2-quinolinemethanethiol, as well as acetate thioesters of these. These compounds are detectable by the human nose at concentrations of only 11.3 parts per billion.

Relations with humans

Bites
It is rare for a healthy skunk to bite a human, though a tame skunk whose scent glands have been removed (usually on behalf of those who will keep it as a pet) may defend itself by biting. There are, however, few recorded incidents of skunks biting humans.  Skunk bites in humans can result in infection with the rabies virus. The Centers for Disease Control (CDC) recorded 1,494 cases of rabies in skunks in the United States for the year 2006—about 21.5% of reported cases in all species. 
Skunks in fact are less prominent than raccoons as vectors of rabies. (However, this varies regionally in the United States, with raccoons dominating along the Atlantic coast and the eastern Gulf of Mexico, while skunks instead predominate throughout the Midwest, including the western Gulf, and in California.)

As pets

Mephitis mephitis, the striped skunk, is the most social skunk and the one most commonly kept as a pet. In the US, skunks can legally be kept as pets in 17 states. When a skunk is kept as a pet, its scent glands are often surgically removed.
 
In the UK, skunks can be kept as pets, but the Animal Welfare Act 2006 made it illegal to remove their scent glands.

See also
 List of fictional musteloids
 Skunk oil

References

External links

 Skunks and the management of skunk damage 

 
Mephitidae
Mammals of Central America
Mammals of North America
Mammals of South America
Aposematic animals
Mammal common names